Gregory Douglass (born December 19, 1980) is an American singer-songwriter.  Douglass plays lead guitar and piano.

Background
Douglass was born and raised in rural Vermont, performing in musical theater and winning local talent shows in his early teens.  He taught himself to play the piano and guitar by age 14, and began writing his own original songs throughout junior high. While attending Brewster Academy in Wolfeboro, New Hampshire, Douglass composed and recorded the material for his first two albums.  On graduation day, the schools' Headmaster presented him with a music award and publicly announced that Douglass was the first student he would ever encourage not to go to college, advice that convinced him to immediately pursue music full-time. Douglass has also been involved in theatre work, both at the amateur and professional levels. His roles included "Hero" in A Funny Thing Happened on the Way to the Forum, alongside actor Topher Grace who played "Pseudolus", while attending Brewster Academy.

Music
Gregory Douglass is an internationally renowned independent musician with eight critically acclaimed albums and a multitude of digital singles & music videos. His recent spotlight on NPR Morning Edition has coined him "one of New England's best-kept secrets."  Douglass has sold over 75,000 songs digitally on his own and his videos have amounted to over 600,000 views on YouTube alone. His music videos have charted numerous times on MTV Network's Logo (TV channel) TV. Douglass was a finalist in the 2011 Mountain Stage NewSong Competition and won the Yobi.tv New Stage competition—an original web series starring Jersey Shore's Mike The Situation (TV personality) Sorrentino.

Douglass has been compared to artists like Tori Amos, Jeff Buckley, Patty Griffin and Rufus Wainwright. His evocative, alternative sound "channels everyone from Stevie Wonder to Fiona Apple in a way that's terrifyingly mature for someone so young" according to Instinct Magazine.  Douglass has shared the stage with artists like They Might Be Giants, Shawn Colvin, The Weepies, Jason Mraz, Regina Spektor, and Margaret Cho.  Douglass' 2009 release BATTLER features duets with friends and fellow Vermonters Grace Potter (Grace Potter & The Nocturnals / Hollywood Records) and Anaïs Mitchell (Righteous Babe Records).

Personal life
Douglass is openly gay, and some of his lyrics deal with queer themes.

Discography

References

External links
Official Website (English)
Last.FM Page (English)

1980 births
Living people
American singer-songwriters
Musicians from Burlington, Vermont
American male singer-songwriters
American gay musicians
LGBT people from Vermont
American LGBT singers
American LGBT songwriters
Gay singers
Gay songwriters
21st-century American male singers
21st-century American singers
20th-century LGBT people
21st-century LGBT people
American gay writers